Ontario Express was an airline in Canada.

Code data
IATA Code: 9X
ICAO Code: OEL
Callsign: PARTNER

History

Ontario Express first started operations on July 15, 1987 as a regional feeder airline for Canadian Airlines based at the Toronto Pearson International Airport. This was a way to apply the newly designed commercial aviation strategy at the time: use smaller aircraft to gather passengers from various locations and "feed" the main airline which would then carry those passengers worldwide. The term "feeder airline" became a standard in all commercial aviation. The other term employed was a "spoke and wheel" type of organization, the spoke being the centre where all the feeder airlines would fly in the passengers from around the area. Operations started with 4 Jetstream 31 aircraft, manufactured by British Aerospace. ATR 42 aircraft, built by a Franco-Italian consortium Avions de transport régional, were added to the fleet in 1988. Ontario Express was the first airline to import and operate those 2 aircraft in Canada. The first cities that were connected to Toronto were: Windsor, Sault Ste. Marie, Sarnia, London, Kingston, Thunder Bay, Ottawa, and Sudbury.

Defunct airlines of Canada
Airlines established in 1987
Airlines disestablished in 1993